Antona is a genus of moths in the subfamily Arctiinae. The genus was erected by Francis Walker in 1854.

Species
 Antona abscissa
 Antona batesii
 Antona celena
 Antona clavata
 Antona coerulescens
 Antona diffinis
 Antona erythromelas
 Antona fallax
 Antona generans
 Antona immutata
 Antona indecisa
 Antona intensa
 Antona mutans
 Antona mutata
 Antona myrrha
 Antona nigrobasalis
 Antona peruviana
 Antona repleta
 Antona semicirculata
 Antona sexmaculata
 Antona suapurensis
 Antona subluna
 Antona tenuifascia
 Antona toxaridia
 Antona variana

References

Lithosiini
Moth genera